The 2017–18 Ligue 1 is the 53rd season of top-tier football in Senegal and the tenth professional season. The season began on 25 November 2017 and ended on 17 June 2018.

Final standings

See also
2018 Senegal FA Cup

References

Senegal Premier League seasons
Senegal
1